David Roy Merritt (born November 16, 1955 in Los Angeles) is an American astrophysicist. Until 2017 he was a professor at the Rochester Institute of Technology in Rochester, New York.  He received in 1982 his PhD in Astrophysical Sciences from Princeton University with thesis advisor Jeremiah P. Ostriker and held postdoctoral positions at the University of California, Berkeley and the Canadian Institute for Theoretical Astrophysics in Toronto.  Merritt's fields of specialization include dynamics and evolution of galaxies, supermassive black holes, and computational astrophysics.

Merritt is a former Chair of the Division on Dynamical Astronomy of the American Astronomical Society. He is a founding member of the Center for Computational Relativity and Gravitation at RIT.

His scientific contributions include Osipkov–Merritt models, black hole spin flips, the Leonard–Merritt mass estimator, the M–sigma relation, stellar systems with negative temperatures,
 and the Schwarzschild Barrier.

Awards and honors
 PROSE Award for Excellence in Physical Sciences and Mathematics, for A Philosophical Approach to MOND (2021) 
Garfinkel Lectureship, Yale University (2014)

Works by Merritt

Books
Merritt, D. Dynamics and Evolution of Galactic Nuclei (Princeton: Princeton University Press), 551 pp., 2013
Merritt, D. A Philosophical Approach to MOND (Cambridge: Cambridge University Press), 282 pp., 2020
Parusniková, Z. and Merritt, D. (Eds.) Karl Popper's Science and Philosophy (Berlin: Springer International Publishing), 383 pp., 2021

Popular articles
Merritt, D. (2021). A Non-Standard Model. Aeon, July 2021.
Ferrarese, L. and Merritt, D. (2002). Supermassive Black Holes. Physics World, June 2002, p. 41.

Philosophical articles
Merritt, D. (2021). Cosmological Realism. Studies in History and Philosophy of Science Part A, August 2021, p. 193-208.
Merritt, D. (2021). Feyerabend's Rule and Dark Matter. Synthese, August 2021.

Videos
 Schwarzschild Barrier

External links
 David Merritt's homepage
 H-index for David Merritt
 "Dark Matter", interview on National Public Radio (8/4/2014)

References

21st-century American astronomers
Princeton University alumni
Rochester Institute of Technology faculty
Living people
1955 births
American Astronomical Society